The 2004 A3 Champions Cup was second edition of A3 Champions Cup. It was held from February 22 to 28, 2003 in Shanghai, China PR.

Participants
 Shanghai Shenhua – 2003 Chinese Jia-A League Champions
 Shanghai International – 2003 Chinese Jia-A League Runners-up
 Yokohama F. Marinos – 2003 J. League Champions
 Seongnam Ilhwa Chunma – 2003 K-League Champions

Group table

Match Results

Awards

Winners

Individual Awards

Goalscorers

External links
2004 A3 Champions Cup in RSSSF.com

A3 Champions Cup
International club association football competitions hosted by China
A3
A3
2004 in Chinese football